The YF-90 is a liquid cryogenic rocket engine burning liquid hydrogen and liquid oxygen in a staged combustion cycle. It is China's first hydrogen-oxygen engine to use the staged combustion cycle and is expected to be used for the second stage of the Long March 9, which is a three-stage rocket with boosters. The engine has advanced features such as variable thrust, multiple ignitions, and automatic fault diagnosis.

History 
On July 28, 2021, the engine's manufacturer, China Aerospace Science and Technology Corporation (CASC) completed the first YF-90 engineering prototype.

On September 23, 2021, the engine successfully underwent its first semi-system test. The YF -90 engine is one of the key technologies for China's deep space exploration ambitions.

In 2023, CASC plans to conduct more tests on the YF-90 engine, as well as on its first-stage counterpart, the YF-130 engine. The YF-130 is a liquid kerosene-oxygen rocket engine with a thrust of 500 tonnes. Both engines are expected to be ready for flight by 2025.

References

Rocket engines using hydrogen propellant
Rocket engines of China
Rocket engines using the staged combustion cycle